Jumprava is a Latvian, and formerly Soviet, musical group. The group was formed in 1984, and was active until 1992, but resumed activities in 1997 and has been active since.

Biography

1984-1987 
During the summer of 1984, a number of other musicians got involved with the band, including .

1987-1992 
In 1987, the group turned more towards electronic music, earning them the nickname "native Depeche Mode".

1997-present 
The group was revived in 1997, and has been active since. In 2019, the group held a concert to commemorate their 35th anniversary.

Discography 

 "Jumprava" (1988)
 "Pilsēta" (1989)
 "Laika atšķirību romance" (1998)
 "Trajektorija" (2001)
 "Inkarmo" (2005)
 "Laiks runā" (2014)
 "Insomnia" (2019)

References 

Latvian electronic music groups
Latvian rock music groups
Latvian pop music groups